Thomas de Grandison, 4th Baron Grandison (died 1 November 1375), KG, was an English soldier and nobleman.

Biography
Thomas was the son of Otes (also seen as Otho) de Grandison (youngest son of William de Grandison, 1st Baron Grandison) and Beatrix Malemayne. He inherited his uncle's John de Grandison titles in 1369.

Grandison led an English force in northwest France in 1370 and was defeated beneath the walls of the Château de la Faigne, by a French army and was captured.  He was created a Knight of the Garter in 1370.

Thomas had married Margaret of Caru, with whom he had no issue. He died on 1 November 1375.

Citations

References

Year of birth unknown
1375 deaths
14th-century English people
English soldiers
14th-century military history of the Kingdom of England
Place of birth missing
Garter Knights appointed by Edward III
Thomas